The 2011 Italian Figure Skating Championships was held in Milan from December 16 through 19, 2010. Skaters competed in the disciplines of men's singles, ladies' singles, pair skating, and ice dancing on the levels of senior and junior. The results were used to choose the teams to the 2011 World Championships, the 2011 European Championships, and the 2011 World Junior Championships.

Senior results

Men

Ladies

Pairs

Ice dancing

External links
 results

2011
2010 in figure skating
2011 in figure skating
Figure Skating Championships,2011
Figure Skating Championships,2011